Magha Puja (also written as Makha Bucha Day) is a Buddhist festival celebrated on the full moon day of the third lunar month in Cambodia, Laos, Thailand, Sri Lanka and on the full moon day of Tabaung in Myanmar. It is the second most important Buddhist festival after Vesak, it celebrates a gathering that was held between the Buddha and 1,250 of his first disciples, which, according to tradition, preceded the custom of periodic recitation of discipline by monks. On the day, Buddhists celebrate the creation of an ideal and exemplary community, which is why it is sometimes called Saṅgha Day, the Saṅgha referring to the Buddhist community, and for some Buddhist schools this is specifically the monastic community. In Thailand, the Pāli term Māgha-pūraṇamī is also used for the celebration, meaning 'to honor on the full moon of the third lunar month'. Finally, some authors referred to the day as the Buddhist All Saints Day.

In pre-modern times, Māgha Pūjā has been celebrated by some Southeast Asian communities. But it became widely popular in the modern period, when it was instituted in Thailand by King Rama IV in the mid-19th century. From Thailand, it spread to other South and Southeast Asian countries. Presently, it is a public holiday in some of these countries. It is an occasion when Buddhists go to the temple to perform merit-making activities, such as alms giving, meditation and listening to teachings. It has been proposed in Thailand as a more spiritual alternative to the celebration of Valentine's Day.

Etymology and date 
Māgha is derived from the name of the third month in the traditional Indian lunar calendar, on which the celebration is held. It is also the name of a star, which during this period is close to the full moon. Māgha Pūjā is held on the full moon day. In a leap year, the celebration will be postponed to the full moon day of the fourth lunar month.

Themes 

Māgha Pūjā day marks an event occurring at the  grove, near Rājagaha (present Rajgir) in northern India, ten months after the enlightenment of the Buddha. The traditional story goes that a meeting was held in the afternoon, that had four characteristics, known as the :

 1,250 disciples came to see the Buddha that evening without being summoned; These were mostly pupils from the Buddha's recently converted disciples, such as the three , and the monks Sāriputta and Mogallāna.
 All of them were Arahants, enlightened disciples;
 All had been ordained by the Buddha himself, and therefore were his direct spiritual descendants;
 It was the full-moon day of the third lunar month.

Because of these four factors, Māgha Pūjā is also known as the Fourfold Assembly Day. On this occasion, the Buddha taught those arahants a summary of Buddhism, called the Ovādapātimokkha. In these, three principles were given:

This is followed by a formulation of Buddhist ideals:

Finally, the last stanza is about the path of religious practice:

According to the traditional Pāli commentaries, the Buddha continued to teach this summary for a period of twenty years, after which the custom was replaced by the recitation of the monastic code of discipline by the Saṅgha themselves. On Māgha Pūjā today, Buddhists celebrate the creation of an ideal and exemplary community.

Māgha Pūjā is also the day that the Buddha is believed to have announced in Vesālī that he would die (parinibbāna) in three months, and after the announcement a supernatural earthquake followed. Moreover, In Sri Lanka, it is considered the day that the Buddha appointed his two main disciples, the monks Sāriputta and Moggallāna. Apart from the religious meaning, Māgha Pūjā also reflects the Southeast Asian agricultural year, as it is celebrated after the harvest.

History 

Little is known on how traditional Buddhist societies celebrated this event in pre-modern times, but Māgha Pūjā was recognized and celebrated in Lan Na, Lan Xang and Northeastern Thailand. Practices of worship probably varied a lot. The first known instance in modern times was during the reign of the Thai king Rama IV (1804–68) who instituted it as a ceremony in 1851. He reasoned that the Māgha Pūjā "... was an important gathering, a miracle in Buddhism. Wise and knowledgeable people have therefore used this opportunity to honour the Buddha and the 1,250 arahants, which is a foundation of faith and a sense of urgency". He first held it in Temple of the Emerald Buddha, in the palace only. In the evening, 31 monks from the temples Wat Bowonniwet Vihara and Wat Ratchapradit would recite the Ovādapātimokkha, lit lanterns around the ubosot (ordination hall), and give a sermon about the same Ovādapātimokkha in the Pāli and Thai languages. The King or his representative would join the yearly ceremony. A recitation text used for this occasion is attributed to Rama IV. As part of an enduring effort to centralize and regularize Thai Buddhism, Rama IV's successor Rama V (1853–1910) expanded the practice and organized it as a national celebration in the Temple of the Emerald Buddha. In 1913, he officially established it as a public holiday, as he started to organize the ceremonies in other places than the palace. By 1937, the ceremony was widely held and observed in Thailand, but by 1957, it had fallen out of usage. Supreme Patriarch-to-be  helped to revive it. From Thailand, the practice spread to neighboring countries which have a majority of Theravāda Buddhists.

Celebrations and observances 
Māgha Pūjā is a day that laypeople make merit. This is usually done with a motivation to improve oneself in the cycle of existence. Monastics and lay devotees will hold processions, light candles, attending preaching and making offerings of food, as well as meditating and Buddhist chants. Also, devotees will sometimes release animals from captivity. Moreover, devotees uphold and reflect on the five Buddhist moral precepts on this day, which includes avoiding intoxicants. Māgha Pūjā is celebrated most extensively in Thailand, but it is a national holiday in most Southeast Asian countries, such as Laos and Myanmar.

Thailand 

In Thailand, Māgha Pūjā is designated as a national holiday, on which sale of alcohol has been strictly prohibited since 2015. On the evening of Māgha Pūjā, urban temples in Thailand hold a candlelight procession and circumambulation around the main ubosot called a wian thian (wian meaning to circle around; thian meaning candle). Furthermore, people will make merit by going to temples and by joining in with activities. Other popular ways to spend one's time in the week of Māgha Pūjā, as found in a 2019 poll by the  among 5,335 respondents of different ages:

At times, special events are also held, such as a recital of the entire Buddhist scriptures and ceremonies for avowing oneself as a Buddhist lay person. The Dhammakaya Temple is particularly known for its visually grand celebration.

In Northern Thailand, Māgha Pūjā was only introduced in the 1960s, by a monk called . It is generally given less attention than in Central Thailand, due to the influence of the Central Ecclesiastical Council being less in the North. The candle procession has only become associated with Māgha Pūjā in the 1990s. In Northern and Northeastern Thailand, Buddhist relics are usually worshiped during the Māgha period.

, the then Minister of Culture, felt this was unnecessary, since "there are quite a lot of occasions" in the Thai calendar to express gratitude. However, in 2006, the government of Thailand made an announcement that Māgha Pūjā should from then on be celebrated as a "national day of gratitude". This was intended as an alternative to Valentine's Day, in which Thai youth often aim to lose their virginity. Māgha Pūjā was therefore presented as a day of spiritual love and gratitude instead. To what extent Thai people are well informed about Māgha Pūjā is in dispute: in 2017, the National Institute of Development Administration (NIDA) held a poll among 1,250 subjects of diverse backgrounds and found that 58 percent of Thai did not know why Māgha Pūjā was important in Buddhism, and 75 percent did not know it had been branded as a day of gratitude. However, the Dusit poll showed that 75 percent of the respondents was able to tell that Māgha Pūjā was the day the Buddha taught the Ovādapātimokkha to his disciples, and 66 percent knew that it was the day that 1,250 of the Buddha's disciples came together spontaneously.

Cambodia

In Cambodia, various celebrations are held during the Māgha Pūjā day. Ceremonies are held at Preah Reach Trop Mountain, for example, which are joined by 30,000 to 50,000 people, as of 2019; as well as alms offerings on Oudong Hill, which are joined yearly by thousands of people. On the day, devotees make merit, cook meals for elderly people or their parents, and clean up their houses. Since the late 2010s, the day has become more popular among youth, and more pagodas are organizing ceremonies. In May 2019, the Cambodian Ministry of Information proposed a ban of advertising of alcohol on Māgha Pūjā and Vesak. Meanwhile, Prime Minister Hun Sen and the Ministry of Cults and Religion have promoted activities on the day, and education for youths about it. However, in August 2019, local media reported the Cambodian government removed Māgha Pūjā from the list of national holidays to increase the country's competitiveness, because the number of holidays had become too high.

Myanmar (Burma)
In Myanmar, Māgha Pūjā is observed on the full moon day of Tabaung, the final month of the Burmese calendar. Furthermore, tradition has it that a king of Ukkalapa completed the building of the Shwedagon Pagoda and enshrined the hair of the Buddha in it on this day. Fifteen days before this full moon day, the Shwedagon Pagoda Festival is held, on which a ceremony is held for offerings to the 28 Buddhas (from Taṇhaṅkara to Gotama Buddha), followed by a 10-day continuous recital of Buddhist texts. Burmese devotees make merits and meditate during this period, and in Mandalay and the North, sand pagodas are made in honor of the Buddha. Other pagoda festivals are held in this period, including the Shwe Settaw Pagoda Festival in the Magwe Region's Minbu Township and the Alaungdaw Kathapa Pagoda Festival, near the Alaungdaw Kathapa National Park in the Sagaing Region. The Botahtaung Pagoda and the Sule Pagoda are also much visited. Furthermore, the Kyaiktiyo Pagoda is very popular, and thousands of candles are lit around the boulder below the pagoda.

Sri Lanka 
In Sri Lanka, Māgha Pūjā is also observed. In the evening, a procession (Sinhala language: perahera) with approximately 5,000 people and many elephants is held, called Gangarama Navam. This tradition started in Sri Lanka in the 1980s, and lasts for two days. Monks walk in the procession as well, chanting paritta texts. Dancers from multiple religious traditions perform during the walk.

Other regions
Chinese communities celebrate a similar festival. In addition, Māgha Pūjā has become a popular event among Buddhist converts in the West, who consider it a day of exchanging gifts.

See also 
Visakha Puja
Asalha Puja
Chotrul Duchen, a festival celebrated in Tibet as an Uposatha day and falls on around the same day as Māgha Pūjā
First Full Moon Festival, a festival celebrated in China, Japan, Korea and Vietnam as an Uposatha day and to mark the end of the Lunar New Year, falling on or around the same day as Māgha Pūjā
Lantern Festival, in China and Taiwan
Daeboreum, in Korea
Koshōgatsu, in Japan
Tết Nguyên tiêu, in Vietnam

Notes

Citations

References

External links 
 Overview of Māgha Pūjā's themes, with a video presentation
 Makha Bucha Day, information about festivals in Thailand, archived from the original on 7 July 2018
 Celebration of Māgha Pūjā Day, hosted on Beliefnet, archived from the original on 28 April 2018
 Animation with traditional explanation of Māgha Pūjā, in Thai with English subtitles

Buddhist festivals in Myanmar
Buddhist festivals in Laos
Buddhist festivals in Cambodia
Buddhist festivals in Thailand
Public holidays in Sri Lanka
Public holidays in Thailand
Religious festivals in Cambodia
Observances held on the full moon
Buddhist festivals in Sri Lanka
Observances set by the Burmese calendar
Public holidays in Myanmar